Hypsilurus capreolatus is a species of agama found in Papua New Guinea.

References

Hypsilurus
Taxa named by Edward Frederick Kraus
Reptiles described in 2012
Agamid lizards of New Guinea